The committees of the 6th Supreme People's Assembly (SPA) of North Korea were elected by the 1st Session of the aforementioned body on 17 December 1977. It was replaced on 5 April 1982 by the committees of the 7th Supreme People's Assembly.

Committees

Bills

Budget

Credentials
Only one member was made public.

National Defence

References

Citations

Bibliography
Books:
 

6th Supreme People's Assembly
1977 establishments in North Korea
1982 disestablishments in North Korea